Sava Centar is an international congress, cultural and business centre of various multi-functional activities located in Belgrade, the capital of Serbia. It is the largest audience hall in the country and entire former Yugoslavia and one of the biggest in Europe. It has been host to numerous large-scale events and performances.

In April 2021, the building was declared a cultural monument.

Location 
Sava Centar is located in the Block 19, in the municipality of New Belgrade. It is situated at 9 Milentija Popovića street. The complex is bounded by the streets of Vladimira Popovića to the east, Milentija Popovića to the west and Bulevar Arsenija Čarnijevića to the south. To the north are other buildings, which occupy the northern section of the Block 19, including the Crowne Plaza Belgrade and Savograd.

History

Origin 

In 1975, after the First Conference of the Organization for Security and Co-operation in Europe, held in Helsinki, Finland, the President of Yugoslavia Josip Broz Tito accepted that Belgrade will host the next summit. However, Belgrade had no congressional facility which could accept so many delegates so it was decided to build a new object. The author of the project, chief designer and team manager was Stojan Maksimović, who had only one month to submit the concept. He was chief designer of the Belgrade Construction Directorate and was given the task in March 1976, directly from the Tito's office. Maksimović spent that month either in seclusion in his office in the City Assembly of Belgrade or on the planes, visiting Paris, The Hague (Babylon), Copenhagen and Helsinki to inspect the existing facilities of this type. Chief engineer was Radomir Mihajlović, Maksimović's colleague. Urban plan for the area was done by Miloš Perović.

Construction 

Works began in April 1976 and after a bit over a year, the object was ceremonially opened on 14 May 1977 by Tito. Construction itself lasted for 11 months. Works on the first stage had to be rushed due to the scheduled OSCE conference, planned for 15 June 1977. This date is today marked as the birthday of Sava Centar, though it was only opening of Block A, followed by Block 2 in 1978 and Block 3 in 1979. The second phase, a large performance and conference hall, opened on the occasion of the 11th Congress of the League of Communists of Yugoslavia. The planned stage at the main hall, which had been fancied as revolving, was scrapped and a fixed large stage was placed instead. By 1979, Hotel Beograd InterContinental, now the Crowne Plaza Belgrade, was added to the complex to host the annual meeting of the World Bank. Supporting architecture such as roads and highway conjunctions were also built during this period around the Sava Centar complex.

The complex, due to its design and speed by which it was finished, attracted international attention. It was among the nominated projects when the inaugural Pritzker Architecture Prize was awarded in 1979. Local press of the day named it "spaceship", "glass garden", "beauty on the Sava", "concrete ship of peace", "goodwill house", etc. As initial period of construction overlapped with the finishing works of the Centre Pompidou in Paris, the two structures were often compared at the time. While the famous Beaubourg was equally praised and criticized, Maksimović's work on Sava Centar was universally applauded.

Later developments 
On 17 August 2006, the parking lot at Sava Centar was renovated to capacitate 410 cars. As a result of the renovation parking fees were introduced for the first time at Sava Centar but are as of 2016/2017 lifted.

In its jubilee year of 2007, when Sava Centar marked its 30th anniversary, a substantial financing was utilized on the reconstruction of the glass façade. Also, the city authorities funded the reconstruction of broken glass on the sideways-facing façade, acquisition of the stage audio equipment for concert appearances and replacement of the main hall seats.

Failed privatization attempts 

By 2017, the 40-years old complex was in a bad financial situation. After it was built, investments into preserving and enhancing the object were minimal. City, which owns the facility, decided to find a strategic partner who will take 49%, while the city will retain 51% in the future joint company. The bidding was announced in 2016 and two companies, Delta Holding and a consortium headed by the Belgrade's Nikola Tesla Airport showed interest. City then four times prolonged the deadlines and decided to change some of the conditions of the bidding, so Delta Holding backed off. After the second bidding, the Airport also withdrew not giving any reasons. When the third bidding was announced in June 2017, no one applied. In November 2017 the city hall announced another bidding in the future, but ordered to three city companies (Belgrade power plants, Cleaning and Belgrade waterworks and sewage) to write off all the claims they have from Sava Centar, in order to make it more attractive for the buyers. The bidding was open in December, with city asking for at least €12.5 million.

Despite writing off many debts, Sava Centar remained one of the Serbian companies with highest tax debts with 558 million dinars (€4.7 million) in the early 2018. Delta Holding reappeared as an interested investor, claiming willingness to pay double, €25 million, than what the city is asking for, to build a footbridge to the future Hotel Intercontinental, planned by the Delta Holding in the vicinity, to accept the entire venue's debt but to split the eventual profit with the city. Instead of announcing the bids, city extended the deadline to 20 March 2018. Delta Holding was the only bidder but their application was rejected as "incomplete", saying that Delta didn't specify how many employees will keep. The commission executing the bidding recommended the direct negotiations with the company, which city administration accepted in July 2018, before changing its mind again in February 2019, opting for the concession, and in November 2019 when city decided to sell the venue.

In January 2020 city confirmed it will sell the building with the starting price of €25 million, while the new owner would have to preserve the function of the venue and to invest €50 in the next 5 years. In August 2020, city conducted a bidding, but raised the price to €27.4 million, keeping other stipulations.

By this time, architects, economists, citizens' groups and political opposition began to criticize city's dealings in the matter, especially in the summer of 2020 when the similar, failed process was conducted for another symbol of Belgrade, the Beograđanka skyscraper. City itself appraised the Sava Centar to €108 million in 2016, but constantly kept offering it for 4 to 9 times lesser price, all the time changing the course and evading to close the deal. Opposition politicians openly accused city administration of corruption and theft. Through repeated, failed bidding, the price of the object is being reduced each time, as allowed by the law, until it is sold to some tycoon close to the ruling establishment for a very low price.

On he other hand, some real estate consultants claim that the city is asking too much for the venue. Miloje Popović, the first manager of the center, said that the city is making a mistake by selling it, that they should devise the right policy for congressional tourism instead, as such objects are never built to be commercial on their own. They attract thousands of people and their spending benefits the entire community. Some economists add that the city's claim of lacking funds to invest in the Sava Centar is false, as the city administration is wasting money on all sides. Public also pressured the administration, calling it incapable of managing the object and opposing the selling.

On 22 August 2020, city announced this bidding failed, too, as no one applied. Delta Holding stated they are still interested, but that almost €80 million of investment into the venue is too much. City said they will probably repeat the bidding before the year's end, without clarifying will they reduce the price for 20% which are they now eligible to do. Designer Maksimović accused city of mismanaging the venue and raised concern that the venue will change its purpose after being sold to private owner. It was also pointed out that city actually never tried to manage the venue properly: appointment of professional and experienced management instead of the party's apparatchiks, ignoramuses and family members; hiring foreign management; serious financial injection based on the detailed and worked-out recovery concept; domestic and foreign patrons; finding the partner through the net of the European Congressional Cities; re-hiring of the original authors to fix architectural and structural problems. Instead, city went right away to sell it.

Delta ownership 

On 11 September 2020, city again offered the object, reducing the price to €21.9 million, with the unchanged amount of future investment, but two weeks later the process failed, too, as again no one applied, so the city offered it again for even more lowered price of €17.5 million on 19 October. The "Delta Holding" appeared as the sole bidder, finally purchasing the venue on 9 November 2020, and announced an investment of €60 million, even higher than stipulated by the contract. Reconstruction was announced for the late 2021.

Replacement of the facade will be the first task, starting at the end of 2021. Delta Holding announced that only foreign architects will be included in the reconstruction. Works will be finished in 2023, and the company expects that the investment will paid off in 12 to 15 years. They continued to claim the price was too high, even though they paid the venue only 180 €/m2. With the building, Delta Holding also acquired some 40 valuable works of art, including paintings, tapestries, sculptures, clock with time zones, etc. Some will also be repaired as they got damaged in time.

Some architects suggested that Sava Centar should be protected by the law and declared a cultural monument. The objects is placed under the preliminary protection, which means it should be treated as protected, until the final decision on protection is made by the Institute for the Protection of Cultural Monuments. Five months after the venue was sold to the private owner, the government declared Sava Centar a cultural monument on 8 April 2021. When the City Assembly of Belgrade announced its next session for 29 April 2021 in the venue, due to the COVID-19 pandemic restrictions, they referred to the structure as the "Delta Congressional Center, former Sava Centar". The management of the Delta Holding reacted, stating the name "Sava Centar" is a city symbol and brand of its own, and that it will not be changed.

The reconstruction began on 23 December 2021, with estimated deadline at late 2023, or early 2024. Despite previous claims, all companies involved in the reconstruction are domestic. The main project was done by "Centroprojekt" studio. The reconstructed venue is planned to resurface as the congressional hub of this part of Europe, with capacity of hosting up to 7,000 visitors. The interiors will be changed to a certain degree, in accordance with Stojan Maksimović, the original designer. The center will consist of two, equally sized sections: business-commercial, and congressional-cultural. Number of seats in the main, "Blue hall", will be somewhat enlarged. The congressional zone will have 45 rooms, instead of 16 as it had before. The "Delta Holding"  claimed in July 2022 that it already has booked congresses for the late 2023 through 2025, and that total cost of purchase, investment and renovation will be north of €90 million.

In January 2023, Delta Holding announced partial reopening of the venue for November 2023. A congressional section, with 40 halls, is scheduled to be opened, including one immersive hall. The value of works was again elevated, to over €100 million.

Structural details 

It annually hosts more than half million visitors. Sava Centar is connected to Crowne Plaza Belgrade via an underground hallway. The complex includes restaurants, bars, offices and shops.

The building is situated on the easily accessible location. The great hall, nicknamed the Blue Hall due to its blue seats is the largest audience hall in the country with the above-mentioned 4,000 seats, both ground and upper level included. The hall has the ability to completely change its look depending on the stage set-up. As a result, the seats can be taken out. It is also the place major cinema premiers are hosted.

In terms of architecture, Sava Centar is fitted into the larger urban area, which developed later under its influence (especially the green glass facades), and consists of the Blocks 19 and 20, encompassing buildings in the modern, glass and steel, style. The complex includes:
 Block 19: Sava Centar, Crowne Plaza Belgrade, Genex apartments, Delta Holding building;
 Block 20: Hyatt Regency Belgrade, NIS building, unfinished headquarters of the "Rad" construction company;

Architecture of the object has been described as excellent, elegantly "landing" in the New Belgrade's lowlands. The venue was labeled as spacious, comfortable, airy and visitors friendly. Unlike the exterior, the interior was changed a lot since the construction was ended. The art critics hailed it for the modern design, sharp lines, unusual outline, wide spans of the construction, cascade terraces, concrete brise soleils, and visible, vividly colored architectural construction. It was noted that "hardly any other building...will communicate with the surroundings so perfectly".

Events 
Sava Centar has hosted among others Gennady Rozhdestvensky, Zubin Mehta, Valery Gergiev, Eiji Oue, Mstislav Rostropovich, Henryk Szeryng, Ivo Pogorelić, Vladimir Ashkenazy, Plácido Domingo, Montserrat Caballé, Johan Strauss Orchestra, Moscow Philharmonic Orchestra, The USSR Ministry Of Culture Orchestra, National Symphony Orchestra (NSO), Okazu Philharmonic Orchestra, Belgrade Philharmonic Orchestra, Metropole Orchestra, Miles Davis, Dizzy Gillespie, Nina Simone, Ray Charles, John Mayall & the Bluesbreakers, Jerry Lee Lewis, Julio Iglesias, Jeff Beck, Johnny Winter, Buddy Guy, Suzanne Vega, Nigel Kennedy, B.B. King, Lou Reed, Roxy Music, Jethro Tull, Sting, David Byrne, Simple Minds, Laurie Anderson, Samantha Fox, Jason Donovan, Slobodan Trkulja, Bilja Krstić, Gotan Project and Madredeus.

It also serves as the venue of the Miss Serbia competition, the Serbian Eurovision Song Contest selection music festivals, Beovizija and was the host place of the Jugovizija (in 1987).

Sava Centar has been the host of significant congress gatherings and artistic programs: Organization for Security and Co-operation in Europe, Annual General Meeting of the International Monetary Fund and the World Bank, 55th Annual General Meeting of Interpol, 6th United Nations Conference on Trade and Development, General Meeting of UNESCO, FOREX, FISIT and 9th Summit of the non-aligned countries.

In January 1990, Sava hosted the 14th (and last) Congress of the League of Communists of Yugoslavia.

In total, from May 1977 to May 2017, over 35,000 events of all kinds were held in the venue, with a total of 15 million visitors, of that 10,000 congressional meetings with 2 million participants.

In June 2018, it held the 6th WordCamp Europe.

References

External links

 
 Page at official Belgrade site

Buildings and structures in Belgrade
Buildings and structures completed in 1977
1977 establishments in Serbia
New Belgrade